Grandinenia is a genus of air-breathing land snails, terrestrial pulmonate gastropod mollusks in the tribe Garnieriini  of the subfamily Garnieriinae in the family Clausiliidae, the door snails.

Species
 Grandinenia amoena (H. Nordsieck, 2002) 
 Grandinenia ardouiniana (Heude, 1885)
 Grandinenia crassilabris H. Nordsieck, 2016
 Grandinenia dautzenbergi (Morlet, 1892)
 Grandinenia fuchsi (Gredler, 1883)
 Grandinenia gabijakabi Grego & Szekeres, 2014
 Grandinenia gastrum (H. Nordsieck, 2005)
 Grandinenia ignea H. Nordsieck, 2012
 Grandinenia magnilabris H. Nordsieck, 2012
 Grandinenia maroskoi Grego & Szekeres, 2011
 Grandinenia mirifica (D.-N. Chen & J.-X. Gao, 1982)
 Grandinenia muratovi Grego & Szekeres, 2019
 Grandinenia ookuboi (H. Nordsieck, 2005)
 Grandinenia pallidissima H. Nordsieck, 2010
 Grandinenia pseudofuchsi (H. Nordsieck, 2005)
 Grandinenia puella H. Nordsieck, 2012
 Grandinenia rex H. Nordsieck, 2007
 Grandinenia rugifera (Möllendorff, 1898)
 Grandinenia rutila H. Nordsieck, 2016
 Grandinenia schomburgi (Schmacker & O. Boettger, 1890)
 Grandinenia steffeki Grego & Szekeres, 2014
 Grandinenia takagii (Chang, 2004)
 Grandinenia tonkinensis (H. Nordsieck, 2010)
 Grandinenia umbra (Chang, 2004)
 Grandinenia unicolor H. Nordsieck, 2012
 Grandinenia yulinensis H. Nordsieck, 2012

References

 Morlet, L., 1893. Descriptions d'espèces nouvelles provenant de l'Indo-Chine. Journal de Conchyliologie 40"1892": 315-329
 Fischer-Piette, E., 1950. Liste des types décrits dans le Journal de Conchyliologie et conservés dans la collection de ce journal (avec planches)(suite). Journal de Conchyliologie 90: 149-180
 Nordsieck, H. (2002). Revision of the Garnieriinae (Gastropoda: Stylommatophora: Clausiliidae), with descriptions of new taxa. Stuttgarter Beiträge zur Naturkunde, Serie A (Biologie), 640: 1-23. Stuttgart
 Minato, H. & Chen, D.-N. (1984). A New Clausiliid Genus Grandinenia for Steatonenia mirifica Chen & Gao, 1982 (Gastropoda : Pulmonata). Venus (Japanese Journal of Malacology). 43(4): 301–304.
 Bank, R. A. (2017). Classification of the Recent terrestrial Gastropoda of the World. Last update: July 16, 2017
ZooKeys 834: 1-166

External links

Clausiliidae